Wilson Canyon is a gorge cut by the Walker River through a series of volcanic cliffs. It is managed by the U.S. Bureau of Land Management.

Description
The canyon runs through the Singatse Range in Lyon County, where the Walker River flows northeast into the Mason Valley. The canyon was named after "Uncle Billy Wilson" who was a miner and rancher, and for whom the Wilson Mining District is also named. The Nevada Copper Belt Railroad ran through Wilson Canyon; the track laid to the canyon was completed shortly before Uncle Billy Wilson's death.

Flooding
What were known as the "1997 New Year's Floods" occurred in western Nevada and northern California. They were the result of a group of snow storms in the Sierra Nevada at the end of 1996. Three additional rainstorms came between December 20, 1996. and January 2, 1997. These heavy rainstorms melted most of the snowpack below  elevation, including that at the headwater of the Walker River. During this period Wilson Canyon flooded, the narrow width of the canyon increasing the amount of damage to the area. Large portions of Route 208 were destroyed, with pieces of roadway being found in the river after the flood subsided. Following the flood the highway was closed for two months and repaired at a cost of $726,000.

References

Canyons and gorges of Nevada
Landforms of Lyon County, Nevada